Randolph County is a county located in the central section of U.S. state of Indiana, on its eastern border with Ohio.  As of 2010, the population was 26,171.  The county seat is Winchester.

History

The Indiana General Assembly authorized the formation of Randolph County from Wayne County in January 1818, to take effect in August 1818. The county was almost certainly named for Randolph County, North Carolina, where the area's first settlers came from. That county was named for Peyton Randolph, the first President of the Continental Congress under the Articles of Confederation.

Between 1820 and 1824, the county's territory extended to the Michigan boundary; consequently, the plat for the town of Fort Wayne (now a city) is recorded in Randolph County's Recorder's Office. Randolph County's population grew rapidly in the early years of the nineteenth century. It became known as a progressive community, with many residents coming from the mid-Atlantic and northern tier free states. Numerous members of the Society of Friends (Quakers) lived here, and they supported public education and abolitionism.

The county was the site of three settlements developed by free African Americans, and by 1845 there were about 500 people of color here.  The most famous, the Greenville Settlement, in Greensfork Township, was in the southeast part of the county and straddled the state line, also partially in Darke County, Ohio. It was the site of the Union Literary Institute, founded in 1846 by Quakers and free people of color. It was primarily for black students of the area, but also accepted whites as one of the first racially integrated schools in the United States. Other predominately black settlements were Cabin Creek, about 10 miles southwest of Winchester, Indiana; and Snow Hill, between Winchester and Lynn, Indiana.

Given its settlement history, with many migrants from the northern tier, Randolph County was politically dominated by the Republican Party into the early twentieth century. Between 1858 and 1931, the county produced two Governors, one Congressman, one U. S. Senator, three Indiana Secretaries of State, and one State Superintendent of Public Instruction. The county's population growth slowed after 1880. Later in the 20th century, with industrialization and demographic changes, many of its residents aligned with the Democratic Party.

Randolph County answered the problem of rural decline in the early twentieth century by embracing much of the "Country Life Movement."  The county consolidated its rural schools.  This was done under the leadership of Lee L. Driver, a county native who became the nation's leading expert on rural school consolidation.  Randolph County became the exemplar of the movement, and was the subject of many publications and visits from officials from as far away as Canada and China.

In the early 21st century, residents in Winchester, Union City, and Farmland have sought to revitalize Randolph County through a renewed focus on historic preservation, heritage tourism, and the arts. The county is included in the Ohio River National Freedom Corridor, as many refugees from slavery sought escape via crossing the Ohio River and using aid of residents at stops along the Underground Railroad, sometimes traveling further north and into Canada. In 2016 a state historical marker was installed at the site of the Union Literary Institute, to recognize its contributions to black and interracial education, and the cause of freedom.

Geography

Randolph County is the point of origin for the White River and Whitewater River.

Adjacent counties
 Jay County  (north)
 Darke County, Ohio  (east)
 Wayne County  (south)
 Henry County (southwest)
 Delaware County (west)

Transportation
  U.S. Route 36
  U.S. Route 35
  U.S. Route 27
  Indiana State Road 1
  Indiana State Road 28
  Indiana State Road 32
  Indiana State Road 227

Cities and towns

Incorporated
 Farmland
 Losantville
 Lynn
 Modoc
 Parker City
 Ridgeville
 Saratoga
 Union City
 Winchester

Unincorporated

 Arba
 Bartonia
 Bloomingport
 Buena Vista
 Carlos
 Crete
 Deerfield
 Fairview
 Georgetown
 Harrisville
 Haysville Corner
 Huntsville
 Maxville
 Mull
 New Lisbon
 New Pittsburg
 Pinch
 Randolph
 Rural
 Scott Corner
 Shedville
 Snow Hill
 South Salem
 Spartanburg
 Stone
 Unionport
 Windsor

Townships 
 Franklin
 Green
 Greensfork
 Jackson
 Monroe
 Stoney Creek
 Union
 Ward
 Washington
 Wayne
 White River

Nettle Creek (Losantville) and West River (Modoc) Townships were combined to form Union Township.

Attractions

Winchester Speedway (one of the world's oldest and fastest high bank half mile tracks in the world) is located approximately 2 miles west of Winchester on State Road 32

Mrs. Wicks Pie Factory and Restaurant in Winchester

Silvertowne (one of the largest privately owned coin shops in the United States) is located in Winchester

Wilson Wines (local winery near Modoc with tours and special events)

McVey Memorial Forest (Located North of Farmland approximately 6 miles on State Road 1)

Farmers market during the summer on the Winchester Square

Local festivals and events

 Mom, Baseball and Apple Pie Festival (Held in Winchester during August annually)
 Labor Day marathon softball tournament (Winchester City Park and draws teams from all over the United States to play softball and celebrate the last holiday of summer. Winchester's population nearly doubles for this weekend.)
 Madi Gras held annually each fall in Winchester during October
 Heritage Days held annually in the fall in Union City.

Airports
 Randolph County Airport (newly expanded in 2010 and 2011)

Climate and weather 

Government

The county government is a constitutional body, and is granted specific powers by the Constitution of Indiana, and by the Indiana Code.

County Council: The county council is the legislative branch of the county government and controls all the spending and revenue collection in the county. Representatives are elected from county districts. The council members serve four-year terms. They are responsible for setting salaries, the annual budget, and special spending. The council also has limited authority to impose local taxes, in the form of an income and property tax that is subject to state level approval, excise taxes, and service taxes.

Board of Commissioners: The executive body of the county is made of a board of commissioners. The commissioners are elected county-wide, in staggered terms, and each serves a four-year term. One of the commissioners, typically the most senior, serves as president. The commissioners are charged with executing the acts legislated by the council, collecting revenue, and managing the day-to-day functions of the county government.

Court: The county maintains a small claims court that can handle some civil cases. The judge on the court is elected to a term of four years and must be a member of the Indiana Bar Association. The judge is assisted by a constable who is also elected to a four-year term. In some cases, court decisions can be appealed to the state level circuit court.

County Officials: The county has several other elected offices, including sheriff, coroner, auditor, treasurer, recorder, surveyor, and circuit court clerk Each of these elected officers serves a term of four years and oversees a different part of county government. Members elected to county government positions are required to declare party affiliations and to be residents of the county.

Randolph County is part of Indiana's 6th congressional district and is represented in Congress by Republican Greg Pence.

Randolph County is one of the most consistently Republican counties in the entire United States. Since 1888, the Republican candidate has only failed to carry the county in a presidential election twice. This occurred in 1912 thanks to the strong third party candidacy of Theodore Roosevelt, as well as 1964 where Barry Goldwater was seen as too conservative statewide & nationally in his landslide loss to Lyndon B. Johnson.

Education
Public schools in Randolph County are administered by the Union School Corporation, Randolph Central School Corporation, Randolph Eastern School Corporation, Randolph Southern School Corporation, and Monroe Central School Corporation.

High schools
 Union High School (Modoc) - Modoc-Union School Corporation
 Randolph Southern High School - Lynn-Randolph Southern School Corporation
 Winchester Community High School - Winchester-Randolph Central School Corporation
 Union City High School - Union City - Randolph Eastern School Corporation
 Monroe Central High School - Parker City - Monroe Central School Corporation

Junior high/middle schools
 Union Jr. High School
 Randolph Southern Jr. High School
 Driver Middle School-Winchester
 West Side Middle School-Union City
 Monroe Central Jr. High School

Elementary schools
 Union Elementary School
 Randolph Southern Elementary School
 Deerfield Elementary School - Winchester
 Baker Elementary School - Winchester
 Williard Elementary School - Winchester
 North Side Elementary School - Union City
 Monroe Central Elementary School

Notable residents 
 Congressman Thomas M. Browne.
 John R. Commons, nationally known economist.
 Governor James P. Goodrich.
 Governor Isaac P. Gray.
 Wendell M. Stanley, Nobel Prize Winner in Chemistry.
 Senator James E. Watson.
 Robert Wise (1914–2005), Hollywood director, was born in Winchester.
 Jim Jones (1931–1978), 1970s leader of the Peoples Temple and founder of Jonestown.
 Rick Derringer of the group, The McCoys, who had the hit song, "Hang On Sloopy". He also did "Rock N Roll Hoochie Koo" and toured with the Ringo Starr, All-Star Band.
 Randy Hobbs, also of the McCoys, one of the great bass guitarists in music history. He also played with Jimi Hendrix, and the Johnny and Edgar Winters Bands.

Fictional residents
The Marshalls of Land of the Lost once lived in Harrisville.

Demographics

As of the 2010 United States Census, there were 26,171 people, 10,451 households, and 7,300 families residing in the county. The racial makeup of the county was 96.1% white, 0.4% black or African American, 0.3% American Indian, 0.2% Asian, 1.8% from other races, and 1.1% from two or more races. Those of Hispanic or Latino origin made up 3.0% of the population. In terms of ancestry, 23.7% were German, 13.9% were Irish, 11.5% were American, and 11.4% were English.

Of the 10,451 households, 31.9% had children under the age of 18 living with them, 53.9% were married couples living together, 11.1% had a female householder with no husband present, 30.2% were non-families, and 25.7% of all households were made up of individuals. The average household size was 2.47 and the average family size was 2.93. The median age was 40.8 years.

The median income for a household in the county was $47,697 and the median income for a family was $45,543. Males had a median income of $37,528 versus $28,851 for females. The per capita income for the county was $19,552. About 10.3% of families and 13.2% of the population were below the poverty line, including 20.3% of those under age 18 and 8.7% of those age 65 or over.

See also
 National Register of Historic Places listings in Randolph County, Indiana

References

 
Indiana counties
1818 establishments in Indiana
Populated places established in 1818